Bebearia aurora is a butterfly in the family Nymphalidae. It is found in the Central African Republic, the Democratic Republic of the Congo, Zambia and Uganda.

Subspecies
B. a. aurora (north-eastern Democratic Republic of the Congo)
B. a. graueri Hecq, 1990 (Democratic Republic of the Congo)
B. a. kayonza (Jackson, 1956) (Uganda: south-west to the Kigezi district)
B. a. theia Hecq, 1989 (Democratic Republic of the Congo: Shaba, Zambia)
B. a. wilverthi (Aurivillius, 1898) (Central African Republic, central Democratic Republic of the Congo)

References

Butterflies described in 1896
aurora
Butterflies of Africa
Taxa named by Per Olof Christopher Aurivillius